Bert Lyons may refer to:

 Bert Lyons (footballer) (Albert Thomas Lyons, 1902–1981), English footballer
 Bert Lyons (trade unionist) (Charles Albert Lyons, died 2008), British trade unionist

See also
 Al Lyons (Albert Harold Lyons, 1918–1965), American baseball player
 Herbert Lyon (1877–?), or Bert Lyon, English footballer